Bruce Wetter is an American writer.

His novel, The Boy with the Lampshade on His Head, deals with issues he experienced while working with foster children and their new parents.

He lives in the Pacific Northwest.

Bibliography
 Bruce Wetter. The Boy with the Lampshade on His Head. 

Living people
Year of birth missing (living people)
21st-century American novelists
American male novelists
21st-century American male writers
Place of birth missing (living people)